The Clark–King House is a historic house in Stone County, Arkansas, just outside the city limits of Mountain View.  Located near the end of County Road 146, it is a single-story log structure with two pens, one built c. 1885 and the other c. 1889.  The main (east-facing) facade has a porch extending across the front, under the gable roof that shelters the original pen.  The breezeway between the pens has been enclosed with board and batten siding. The first pen was built by P.C. Clark; the second by Rev. Jacob King, a prominent local circuit preacher of the period.

The house was listed on the National Register of Historic Places in 1985.

See also
National Register of Historic Places listings in Stone County, Arkansas

References

Houses on the National Register of Historic Places in Arkansas
Houses completed in 1885
Houses in Stone County, Arkansas
National Register of Historic Places in Stone County, Arkansas